Hridaynath Mangeshkar (Marathi pronunciation: [ɦɾud̪əjnaːt̪ʰ məŋɡeːʃkəɾ]) is an Indian music director. He is the only son of musician Deenanath Mangeshkar and younger brother of Lata Mangeshkar and Asha Bhosle. He is popularly known as Balasaheb in the music and film industry.

Career

Hridaynath debuted his music career in 1955 with the Marathi film Akash Ganga. Since then, he has composed for various Marathi films such as Sansar, Chaani,  Ha Khel Savalyancha, Janaki, Jait Re Jait, Umbartha and Nivdung and a few Bollywood films; the most notable among them being Subah, Lekin... and Maya Memsaab.

He has been very selective with his work. He has composed songs in Marathi and Hindi. His songs often have complex meters and require singers of great range and depth for enjoyable renditions. His composition of Vinayak Damodar Savarkar's poem Saagara Pran Talamalala is a case in point. His 1982 album Dnyaneshwar Mauli, featuring compositions from Jñāneśvar, one of the most famous poets in Marathi literature, set the standard for modern devotional music in Marathi.

He also composed music for Doordarshan musical drama Phoolwanti.

He has also composed folk songs. Staying true to the spirit, his Koli Geets (fishermen songs) reflect the traditional rhythms of the fishermen of Konkan. His music to the critically acclaimed movie Jait Re Jait is another example of his prowess in this genre. One of his most popular works is the composition for the Marathi film Nivdung.

At one point, Hridaynath was a student of Ustad Amir Khan; however, he feels that his guru is not as timeless as his sister Lata.

He has been the recipient of several awards throughout his career, such as the prestigious National Award at the hands of the President of India, the Lata Mangeshkar Award of Maharashtra state, and seven Maharashtra State Awards for Best Vocalist and Music Director/Composer.

He was awarded the title pandit by the people of Maharashtra at the hands of Bhimsen Joshi and Jasraj. The Shankaracharya has conferred upon him the title Bhaav Gandharva.

He was awarded Padma Shri by the Government of India in 2009.

Some of his most memorable Hindi film scores are Harishchandra Taramati, Prarthana,  Chakra, Lekin..., Maya Memsaab, Lal Salaam, Yash Chopra's Mashaal, Dhanwan and Chaani, to name a few.

He is also the first Indian composer to compose and release two entire albums featuring the poems and songs of the poet-saint Meera, titled Chala Vahi Des and Meera Bhajans. He has recently also composed and released an album titled Meera Soor Kabeera, featuring the works of Meera, Kabir and Surdas. He produced an album featuring the ghazals of Ghalib, titled Ghalib and sung by Lata Mangeshkar. His collaborations with noted Marathi poets such as Shanta Shelke and Suresh Bhat have produced many Marathi classic songs of unmatched popularity.

He joined the political party Shiv Sena in 2009.

Filmography

Marathi
Akash Ganga (1955)
Sansar (1971)
Ha Khel Savalyancha (1976)
Chaani (1977)
Janaki
Jait Re Jait (1977)
Umbartha (1982)
Nivdung (1989)

Hindi
Harishchandra Taramati (1963)
Dhanwan (1981)
Subah
Prarthana
Chakra
Mashaal (1984)
Lekin... (1991)
Maya Memsaab (1993)
Lal Salaam (2002)

Awards

 1990 (38th National Film Awards) – National Film Award for Best Music Direction for Lekin...
Official citation: For using traditional tunes and instruments creatively, with lilting melody and haunting perfection.

 2009 – Padma Shri

See also

 Mangeshkar Family

References

External links

Indian male playback singers
Singers from Mumbai
Goan people
Living people
Marathi-language singers
Marathi playback singers
Recipients of the Padma Shri in arts
Shiv Sena politicians
Best Music Direction National Film Award winners
Hridaynath
1937 births